Wesley was an unincorporated community located  in Wood County, West Virginia, United States.

References 

Unincorporated communities in West Virginia
Unincorporated communities in Wood County, West Virginia